Tanzanian Americans are Americans of Tanzanian descent. In the 2000 US Census, 2,921 people reported Tanzanian ancestry. To this figure we must adhere some people (less of 300 each) that hailed be of "Tanganyika" and "Zanzibar Islanders" descend. Between 2009-2011 were registered 20,308 Tanzanians living in United States (this figure excludes Americans descended from Tanzanians).

A drought in Tanzania during the early 1980s caused a worsening of economic conditions in the country and motivated some people to emigrate, arriving in the United States in appreciable numbers beginning in 1986 with the arrival of 370 Tanzanians.

Demography 
Based on 2009-2011 data, an estimated 15.2 percent (range of estimate: 11.5 to 18.9 percent) of Tanzanian Americans were 17 or younger. Their estimated median age was 37.8 (range of estimate: 35.8 to 39.8 years of age). Approximately 47.9 percent (range of estimate: 41.4 to 54.4 percent) of them had a least a bachelor's degree. An estimated 2.2 percent (range of estimate: 1.1 to 3.3 percent) of them were living outside the U. S. one year before. Of those born outside the U. S., an estimated 40.8 percent had become U. S. citizens.
Of all Tanzanian Americans born outside the U. S., an estimated 47.0 percent (range of estimate: 41.8 to 52.2 percent) entered the country after 1999. Their estimated median household income was USD 67,327 (range of estimate: USD 59,861 to 74,793).

Although Tanzania belonged to United Kingdom, only the 16% of the Tanzanian population in United States had the English as tongue mother, while the 84.0% of this population had other languages as mother tongues.

Tanzanian Americans in Chicago

Most Tanzanians who have arrived since 1986 have chosen to settle in Chicago. Many of them are students and professionals who came to the city to pursue an advanced degree or work for an employer that sponsored their entry into the United States. Some of the Tanzanians have returned to their home country a few years after arriving in the U. S.

Religion plays an active role in the lives of many Tanzanian Americans in Chicago.

Tanzanian Americans elsewhere in the United States

The Tanzanian American associations in the United States include the Tanzanian American Association (Inc.) in Massachusetts and the Tanzania Association Of Wichita, Kansas.

Notable people

John Abraham, former mayor of Teaneck, New Jersey
Ida Ljungqvist
Clea Koff, forensic anthropologist and author
Vivek Kundra, former first chief information officer of the United States
Harold O'Neal, composer

See also

Southeast Africans in the United States
Tanzanian Canadians
Tanzanians in Ireland
Tanzanians in the United Kingdom
Tanzanians in the Netherlands
Tanzanians in Belgium
Tanzanians in France
Tanzanians in Switzerland
Tanzanians in Italy
Tanzanians in Germany
Tanzanians in Denmark
Tanzanians in Norway
Tanzanians in Sweden
Tanzanians in Poland
Tanzanian Australians
Tanzania–United States relations

References 

 
Southeast Africans in the United States